Hava Eti Atiya (born 12 February 1960) is an Israeli politician who currently serves as a member of the Knesset for Likud.

Biography
Atiya was born in Lod in 1960 into a family that had immigrated from Djerba in Tunisia. She attended Bar-Ilan University, where she earned a BA in social science  and an MA in internal auditing. She also studied for an LLB at Ono Academic College. During the late 1980s she began working for the National Union of Israel Aerospace Industries Employees. In 1993 she was appointed chief of staff to the union's secretary, Haim Katz. When Katz was appointed Minister of Labor, Welfare and Social Services in 2015, she left the union to become his chief of staff.

In the build-up to the April 2019 elections, Atiya was placed twenty-first on the Likud list, the slot reserved for Gush Dan. She was elected to the Knesset as Likud won 36 seats. She was subsequently re-elected in September 2019, March 2020 and March 2021, but lost her seat in the 2022 elections after being placed thirty-fifth on the Likud list.

References

External links

1960 births
Living people
Bar-Ilan University alumni
Israeli people of Tunisian-Jewish descent
Jewish Israeli politicians
Likud politicians
Members of the 21st Knesset (2019)
Members of the 22nd Knesset (2019–2020)
Members of the 23rd Knesset (2020–2021)
Members of the 24th Knesset (2021–2022)
Members of the 25th Knesset (2022–)
Ono Academic College alumni
People from Lod
Women members of the Knesset